Hernán Díaz Arrieta (1891–1984), widely known by his pen name, Alone, was a Chilean writer, film critic and memoirist. He won the Chilean National Prize for Literature in 1959.

Díaz Arrieta was born on May 11, 1891, in the town of Buin on the outskirts of Santiago, Chile. He spent a year in the Seminary of Santiago, a year at the Instituto Comercial de Santiago, and finally attended dental school for a brief time. He then began a 25-year career in the Ministry of Justice eventually becoming the head of the Civil Registry. Despite receiving little formal training, he began his literary career at an early age. In 1913, he published two stories in the journal Pluma y Lapiz under the pseudonym Alone. He published his only novel in 1915 before devoting his attention to literary criticism. In a career spanning more than sixty years, Alone wrote for a wide array of newspapers and periodicals, penning, most notably, the column Crónica Literaria, which first appeared in La Nación and later in El Mercurio. He became well known for his fluid and distinct style, and is considered to be the greatest Chilean prose writer of the mid-20th century. Several writers profited from his active promotion of their work, especially María Luisa Bombal and the poet Gabriela Mistral. Despite his vehement opposition to Communism, he nevertheless was an outspoken admirer of the poet and Pablo Neruda who was a prominent member of the Communist Party of Chile. He was a staunch catholic and supporter of the right-wing political movement that culminated in the 1973 overthrow of the leftist President of Chile, Salvador Allende.

Alone lived his whole life in the same residence, a house he obtained with a mortgage at the beginning of his career in the Civil Service. Nearly blind and unable to speak, Alone died on January 24, 1984, at the age of 92.

Notable Works

Historia Personal de la Literatura Chilena (1954)

 (1956)

Leer y escribir (1962)

Preterito, Imperfecto (1976)

References

 Biography and collection of documents by and about Hernan Diaz Arrieto Biography and collection of documents by and about Hernan Diaz Arrieto

1891 births
1984 deaths
Chilean male writers
National Prize for Literature (Chile) winners